Cymidae is a family of true bugs in the order Hemiptera. There are about 12 genera and at least 60 described species in Cymidae.

Genera
These 12 genera belong to the family Cymidae:

 Ashlockia Hamid, 1975
 Cymocoris Popov, 1986
 Cymodema Spinola, 1837
 Cymus Hahn, 1833
 Neocymodema Hamid, 1975
 Neocymus Van Duzee, 1932
 Nesocymus Kirkaldy, 1907
 Ontiscus Stal, 1874
 Pseudocymus Van Duzee, 1936
 Sephora Kirkaldy, 1902
 † Cephalocoris Heer, 1853
 † Procymus Usinger, 1940

References

Further reading

External links

 

Lygaeoidea
Heteroptera families
Articles created by Qbugbot